Randoulf Allan Osburn (born November 26, 1952) is a Canadian former professional ice hockey left winger who played 27 National Hockey League (NHL) games with the Toronto Maple Leafs and Philadelphia Flyers between 1972 and 1974. He was traded along with Dave Fortier from the Maple Leafs to the Flyers for Bill Flett on May 27, 1974. The rest of his career, which lasted from 1972 to 1978, was spent in the minor leagues.

Career statistics

Regular season and playoffs

References

External links
 

1952 births
Living people
Canadian expatriate ice hockey players in the United States
Canadian ice hockey left wingers
Hamilton Red Wings (OHA) players
Ice hockey people from Simcoe County
London Knights players
Oklahoma City Blazers (1965–1977) players
Philadelphia Firebirds (AHL) players
Philadelphia Firebirds (NAHL) players
Philadelphia Flyers players
Richmond Robins players
Toronto Maple Leafs draft picks
Toronto Maple Leafs players
Tulsa Oilers (1964–1984) players
Sportspeople from Collingwood, Ontario